The 20th Assembly District of Wisconsin is one of 99 districts in the Wisconsin State Assembly. Located in southeastern Wisconsin, the district is entirely contained within Milwaukee County.  It comprises the suburban cities of Cudahy and St. Francis, and some of the far south side of the city of Milwaukee.  It includes Tippecanoe neighborhood, part of the Bay View neighborhood, and Milwaukee Mitchell International Airport.  The district is represented by Democrat Christine Sinicki, since January 1999.

The 20th Assembly district is located within Wisconsin's 7th Senate district, along with the 19th and 21st Assembly districts.

List of past representatives

References 

Wisconsin State Assembly districts
Milwaukee County, Wisconsin